The arrondissement of Thionville-Est is a former arrondissement of France in the Moselle department in the Lorraine region. In 2015 it was merged into the new arrondissement of Thionville. It had 75 communes, and its population was 79,847 (2012).

Composition

The communes of the arrondissement of Thionville-Est, and their INSEE codes, were:

History

The arrondissement of Thionville-Est was created in 1919. It was disbanded in 2015. As a result of the reorganisation of the cantons of France which came into effect in 2015, the borders of the cantons are no longer related to the borders of the arrondissements. The cantons of the arrondissement of Thionville-Est were, as of January 2015:
 Cattenom
 Metzervisse
 Sierck-les-Bains
 Thionville-Est
 Thionville-Ouest
 Yutz

References

Thionville-Est